The W54 (also known as the Mark 54 or B54) was a tactical nuclear warhead developed by the United States in the late 1950s. The weapon is notable for being the smallest nuclear weapon in both weight and yield to have entered US service.

The weapon had two distinct versions: a warhead used in the AIM-26 Falcon air-to-air missile and in the Davy Crockett recoilless gun, and another used in the Special Atomic Demolition Munition (SADM) system, along with several mods (modifications) for each version. The two types are distinct in that much of the design between them was different, to the point that during the development of the SADM it was proposed that it be given its own unique mark designation.

A later development was the W72, which was a rebuilt W54 used with the AGM-62 Walleye guided bomb. The W72 was in service until 1979.

Development

Warhead

Interest in a lightweight, low-yield weapon for the Falcon and Davy Crockett began in 1958. The weapon was initially developed by the University of California Radiation Laboratory at Livermore (renamed Lawrence Radiation Laboratory from August 1958 until 1971) under the XW-51 designation, but in January 1959 the development of the weapon was transferred to Los Alamos National Laboratory and redesignated the XW-54.

For both the Falcon and Davy Crockett, the Department of Defense would supply the weapon systems and adaptation kits for the warheads, while the warheads and firing systems would be the responsibility of the Atomic Energy Commission. First production date for the Falcon warhead was planned for February 1961 while the warhead for the Davy Crockett was given a planned first production date of October 1961. This was because it was felt that the higher acceleration experienced by the warhead in Davy Crockett service would make certification of parts more challenging.

It was hoped during development that the same warhead for both applications could be used, but the requirements for the environmental sensing device - used to detect if the weapon was in its correct military environment and in turn disable weapon safing devices - for each application was quite different. In Falcon use, the warhead experienced  of acceleration for 0.8 seconds while in Davy Crockett use the weapon experienced  for 3 milliseconds.

Sandia reported the problem in May 1959, stating that if Falcon warheads had the greater priority, an interim environmental sensing device could be developed. The Air Force subsequently accelerated the availability date for the Falcon missile and Sandia design released the warhead without an environmental sensing device in October 1959. However, revisions were issued in December before warhead production began with a suitable environmental sensing device for Falcon use.

A single environmental sensing device for both systems was abandoned at this time and development on the XW-54-X1 and XW-54-X2 for Davy Crockett use began. The XW-54-X2 warhead would lack any environmental sensing device for initial deployment, while the XW-54-X1 fitted with a suitable environmental sensing device would replace the XW-54-X2 as the weapon became available. Sandia were against the development of the XW-54-X2 as simply disconnecting the adaptation kit would disable the weapon's safeties.

The Department of Defense cancelled the requirement for the XW-54-X2 (now called the Mk 54 Mod 1) in July 1960 after parts manufacturing slippage delayed production of the warhead. This also caused the accelerated schedule for the Falcon application to slip to January 1961.

Production of both the Falcon warhead (now called the Mk 54 Mod 0) and the XW-54-X1 for the Davy Crockett (now called the Mk 54 Mod 2) was achieved in April 1961. Both the Mod 0 and Mod 2 weapons were interchangeable by changing the environmental sensing device.

Special Atomic Demolition Munition

Interest in the Special Atomic Demolition Munition (SADM) began in February 1958 when the Army desired a new munition that could be carried by one man. The project was delayed by the needs of the Falcon and Davy Crockett application until November 1959.

The proposal noted that the existing atomic demolition munition (ADM), the T-4 Atomic Demolition Munition, was based on the Mark 9 gun-type artillery shell and that transport required four men, each carrying a  section of the weapon. The weapon would also have a waterproof housing, have a pack for carrying in the field and a shock-mitigating container for parachute delivery.

Development began June 1960. Because much of the weapon would be different from the XW-54 warhead, it was proposed that the warhead be given its own unique mark designation, such as TX-58 (later used for the Polaris A-3 warhead), but the decision was made to retain the existing mark number.

The weapon was delayed until August 1963 due to issues with the timer. These included premature firing of the timer and issues with bearing materials. An interim Mk 54 Mod 0 weapon (now called the B54-0) was put into production in April 1963. Drop tests for this weapon were conducted at velocities up to  vertical and  horizontal without damage.

Production of the B54 Mod 1 SADM began in August 1964. The body was constructed with aluminium forgings and moulded fibreglass, and foam-rubber insulation was used between the warhead and case. Dials were illuminated with a tritium-phosphor paint for easy night-reading. A housing for underwater emplacement was provided which included external controls.

The B54 Mod 2 started production in June 1965. This may be the highest yield boosted version of the weapon.

Design
The weapon was based on the Scarab device, which descended from the Gnat device. Scarab was also used as a primary stage in the thermonuclear weapon test Dominic Nambe.

Warhead
Configured in the Davy Crockett role, the weapon contained two sets of fuzes: a radar based fuze set for a  airburst and a capacitance based fuze set for  airburst. These fuzes represented the high and low airburst modes of the weapon. The device contained  of high explosives.

Official documents give the yield as  when configured in the XM388 round for the Davy Crockett.

It has been alleged that the British "Wee Gwen" warhead was a copy of the W54. Though never put into production, Wee Gwen was to contain  of plutonium and  uranium.

Special Atomic Demolition Munition
Yield is estimated to be .

The B54 SADM included a Field Wire Remote Control System (FWRCS), a device that enabled the sending of safe/arm and firing signals to the weapon via a wire for safe remote detonation of the weapon by troops. This system was tested for its resistance to electromagnetic radiation in February 1964.

Variants 

W54 mod numbers overlap between the warhead and SADM weapon. Weapons of the same mod number but in different applications are not the same weapons.

Warhead

Three mods of the warhead configuration were developed:

W54 Mod 0 – Warhead for AIM-4 Falcon air-to-air missile

W54 Mod 1 – Interim warhead for Davy Crockett. Lacked environmental sensing device. Never entered production.

W54 Mod 2 – Production Davy Crockett warhead with environmental sensing device. Was known as the M-388 when configured into a Davy Crockett round.

Special Atomic Demolition Munition
Three mods of the SADM configuration were developed:

B54 Mod 0 – Interim weapon with timer issues.

B54 Mod 1 – Production weapon. Came with special housing for underwater use.

May be a boosted weapon.

In service, the weapons were known as the XM129 and XM159 Atomic Demolition Charges. Which versions are associated with the XM129 name and which is associated with the XM159 name is not clear.

W72 Warhead

After the AIM-26 Falcon was retired, 300 units were rebuilt into an improved configuration with a higher yield and redesignated the W72. These warheads were then used to produce a number of nuclear versions of the AGM-62 Walleye television-guided glide bomb system. The W72 variant had a yield of around 600 tons of TNT. The 300 W72 units were produced between 1970 and 1972 and were in service until 1979.

Testing 
Stockpiled W54 warheads were test-fired at the Nevada Test Site on July 7 and July 17, 1962. In Little Feller I (July 17), the warhead was launched as a Davy Crockett device from a stationary 155-millimeter launcher and set to detonate low airburst  from the launch point. This test was the last atmospheric test at Nevada Test Site and was performed in conjunction with Operation Ivy Flats, a simulated military environment. It was observed by Attorney General Robert F. Kennedy and presidential adviser General Maxwell D. Taylor.

See also 
 List of nuclear weapons

References

External links
 List of all US Nuclear Weapons at Nuclear Weapon Archive
 W54 at GlobalSecurity.org
 The Davy Crockett at the Brookings Institution

Nuclear warheads of the United States